The women's road time trial competition of the cycling events at the 2011 Pan American Games was held on October 16 at the Guadalajara Circuit in Guadalajara. The defending Pan American Games champion is Anne Samplonius of Canada.

Schedule
All times are Central Standard Time (UTC−6).

Results
15 competitors from 11 countries are scheduled to compete.

References

External links
Road cycling schedule

Cycling at the 2011 Pan American Games
2011 in women's road cycling
Road cycling at the Pan American Games